Nicholas Andries (born November 19, 1990) is an American open-wheel racing driver from Pinellas Park, Florida.

Career 
After karting from the age of 5 in 1995 to 2008, Andries competed in the Skip Barber Scholarship Shootout in 2008 winning one of 3 top prizes. Funded on the scholarship in 2009 Andries dominated the Skip Barber Summer Series with 11 wins and 14 podiums in 14 races, winning the Championship and Rookie of the Year. Andries moved to the Skip Barber National Championship in 2010, finishing sixth with one win and three other podium finishes. He also participated in nine of the thirteen rounds of the Star Mazda Championship for Andersen Racing with a best finish of sixth at the Iowa Speedway and good enough for fifteenth in the championship.

In 2011 Andries competed in the full Star Mazda season for Team Pelfrey. He failed to win, but finished on the podium a series high seven times, including four runner-up finishes. He finished third in points.

Andries made his Firestone Indy Lights debut for Bryan Herta Autosport in Long Beach.

For 2013, Andres returned to the renamed Pro Mazda Series, driving for JDC MotorSports.

Motorsports career results

American open–wheel racing results 
(key)

Pro Mazda Championship

Indy Lights 

 Season still in progress

References

External links

Living people
1990 births
People from Pinellas Park, Florida
Racing drivers from Florida
Indy Pro 2000 Championship drivers
Indy Lights drivers

Team Pelfrey drivers
Bryan Herta Autosport drivers
JDC Motorsports drivers